Slovak Karst National Park (Národný park Slovenský kras) is a national park in the Slovak Karst (Slovenský kras) mountain range in South East Slovakia. It lies in the Gelnica, Rožňava and Košice–okolie districts in the Košice region.
The National Park covers an area of 346.11 km² (133.64 mi²) and its buffer zone covers 117.41 km² (45.33 mi²).

The park was established on 1 March 2002, after being a protected landscape area since 1973. Slovak Karst is the first Slovak biosphere reserve since 1 March 1977, when it was included in the UNESCO's Programme on Man and the Biosphere. In 1995, 12 out of 700 caves in the park were recognized as a UNESCO World Heritage Site.

See also
Caves of Aggtelek Karst and Slovak Karst UNESCO World Heritage site
Protected areas of Slovakia

External links
Slovak Karst National Park at Slovakia.travel

National parks of Slovakia
Biosphere reserves of Slovakia
Geography of Košice Region
Karst
Protected areas of the Western Carpathians
Protected areas established in 2002
2002 establishments in Slovakia
Tourist attractions in Košice Region